This is a list of seasons played by Club Gimnàstic de Tarragona, S.A.D. in Spanish and European football, from 1943 (the year of the club's first appearance in Tercera División) to the most recent completed season.

This list details the club's achievements in all major competitions, and the top scorers for each season. Top scorers in bold were also the top scorers in the Spanish league that season. Only Copa del Rey is included.

Seasons

Key

P = Played
W = Games won
D = Games drawn
L = Games lost
F = Goals for
A = Goals against
Pts = Points
Pos = Final position
Pri = La Liga
Seg = Segunda División
Seg B = Segunda División B
Ter = Tercera División
UC = UEFA Cup
CL = UEFA Champions League
n/a = Not applicable
R1 = Round 1
R2 = Round 2
R3 = Round 3
R32 = Round of 16
R16 = Round of 16
QF = Quarter-Finals
SF = Semi-Finals
R/U = Runners-up
W = Winners

Note: bold text indicates a competition won.
''Note 2: Where fields are left blank, the club did not participate in a competition that season.

Footnotes

Seasons
Gimnastic de Tarragona
Gimnàstic de Tarragona seasons
Association football lists by Spanish club